Pringle Bay is a small, affluent coastal village in the Overberg region of the Western Cape, in South Africa. It is situated at the foot of Hangklip, on the opposite side of False Bay from Cape Point. The town and surrounds are part of the Kogelberg Biosphere Reserve, a UNESCO Heritage Site. The bay is named after Rear-Admiral Thomas Pringle, of the Royal Navy, who commanded the naval station at the Cape in the late 1790s.

Situated between Betty's Bay and Gordon's Bay, many of the houses in the small community are only used as holiday houses by their owners. It is accessed by the R44, which connects it to the N2.

Pringle Bay is well known for the Hangklip (hanging rock) that leans out to sea and marks the eastern end of False Bay. The Hangklip Mountain at 484m above sea level is packed with numerous natural caves, and was once a refuge for bandits and slaves escaping their Dutch masters, hence the mountain cave being named “Drostersgat” - Deserters Cave. 

The beach is exposed to the wind, and frequently empty. The village is regarded as one of the safest in the country, naturally being family friendly and is home to a number of restaurants and curio shops which serve locals, holiday-makers and passers-by.

Notes

References

External links

ViewOverberg overview
Accommodation in the Kogelberg Biosphere
History of Pringle Bay

Populated places in the Overstrand Local Municipality